Cyperus altochrysocephalus is a species of sedge that is native to an area which includes parts of Angola and Zambia.

The species was first formally described by the botanist Kåre Arnstein Lye in 1988.

See also
 List of Cyperus species

References

altochrysocephalus
Plants described in 1988
Flora of Angola
Flora of Zambia
Taxa named by Kåre Arnstein Lye